The 2014 Currie Cup Premier Division was the 76th season in the competition since it started in 1889 and was contested from 9 August to 25 October 2014. The tournament (known as the Absa Currie Cup Premier Division for sponsorship reasons) is the top tier of South Africa's premier domestic rugby union competition.

Competition

There was eight participating teams in the 2014 Currie Cup Premier Division. A proposed expansion to eight teams was initially rejected, but was then subsequently approved on 13 February 2014.

Qualification

The six franchise 'anchor' teams plus the  automatically qualified to the 2014 Currie Cup Premier Division, plus the winner of a qualifying tournament between the other seven teams.

Regular season and title playoffs

The eight teams were divided into two sections, based on their 2013 positions. Teams in each section played each other twice over the course of the season, once at home and once away. Teams also played cross-section matches, playing one match (either home or away) against the teams in the other sections.

Teams received four points for a win and two points for a draw. Bonus points were awarded to teams that scored 4 or more tries in a game, as well as to teams that lost a match by 7 points or less. Teams were ranked by points, then points difference (points scored less points conceded).

The top 4 teams qualified for the title play-offs. In the semi-finals, the team that finished first had home advantage against the team that finished fourth, while the team that finished second had home advantage against the team that finished third. The winners of these semi-finals played each other in the final, at the home venue of the higher-placed team.

Relegation playoffs

Non-franchise teams finishing in the bottom two would be included in the qualification rounds for the following season.

Teams

Team Listing

Attendances

The following attendance figures were published at the end of the season:

Log
The final log of the round-robin stage of the 2014 Currie Cup Premier Division is:

Fixtures and results

The fixtures for the 2014 Currie Cup Premier Division were released on 11 March 2014:

Round one

Round two

Round three

Round four

Round Five

Round Six

Round Seven

Round Eight

Round Nine

Round Ten

Semi-finals

Final

Honours

Players

Player Statistics

The following table contain points which have been scored in the 2014 Currie Cup Premier Division:

Squad Lists

The following players have been named in the squads for the 2014 Currie Cup Premier Division:

Forwards

 Jacques du Plessis
 Jacques Engelbrecht
 Dean Greyling
 Grant Hattingh
 Nico Janse van Rensburg
 Werner Kruger
 Wiaan Liebenberg
 Bandise Maku
 Bongi Mbonambi
 Morné Mellett
 Jono Ross
 Basil Short
 Deon Stegmann
 Marcel van der Merwe
 Hencus van Wyk
 Callie Visagie
 Paul Willemse
 Did not play:
 Arno Botha
 Irné Herbst
 Frik Kirsten
 Victor Matfield
 Marvin Orie
 Juan Schoeman
 Roelof Smit
 Pierre Spies
 Flip van der Merwe
 Nardus van der Walt
 Jaco Visagie
Backs

 Bjorn Basson
 Ulrich Beyers
 JJ Engelbrecht
 Tony Jantjies
 Jesse Kriel
 Sampie Mastriet
 Akona Ndungane
 Ryan Nell
 Burger Odendaal
 Rudy Paige
 Handré Pollard
 Jacques-Louis Potgieter
 Tian Schoeman
 William Small-Smith
 Joshua Stander
 Jamba Ulengo
 Piet van Zyl
 Jurgen Visser
 Did not play:
 Francois Hougaard
 Travis Ismaiel
 Lohan Jacobs
 Jan Serfontein
 Dries Swanepoel
Coach

 Frans Ludeke

Forwards

 Tim Agaba
 Thembelani Bholi
 Tom Botha
 David Bulbring
 Steve Cummins
 Aidon Davis
 Albé de Swardt
 Charl du Plessis
 Martin Ferreira
 Lizo Gqoboka
 Simon Kerrod
 Cameron Lindsay
 Charles Marais
 Edgar Marutlulle
 Shaun McDonald
 Darron Nell
 Devin Oosthuizen
 Paul Schoeman
 Steven Sykes
 BG Uys
 CJ van der Linde
 Michael van Vuuren
 Luke Watson
 Stefan Willemse
 Did not play:
 Brenden Olivier
 Dane van der Westhuyzen
Backs

 Tobie Botes
 Ronnie Cooke
 Ntabeni Dukisa
 Shane Gates
 Siyanda Grey
 Jaco Grobler
 Dwayne Jenner
 Kevin Luiters
 Siviwe Soyizwapi
 Gary van Aswegen
 Scott van Breda
 George Whitehead
 Tim Whitehead
 Did not play:
 Enrico Acker
 Eben Barnard
 Hansie Graaff
 Paul Perez
 Sergeal Petersen
 Marlou van Niekerk
Coach

 Carlos Spencer

Forwards

 Dolph Botha
 Tienie Burger
 Neil Claassen
 Jean Cook
 Luan de Bruin
 Lood de Jager
 Brendon Groenewald
 Vince Jobo
 Lappies Labuschagné
 AJ le Roux
 Hercú Liebenberg
 Werner Lourens
 George Marich
 Oupa Mohojé
 Trevor Nyakane
 Caylib Oosthuizen
 Coenie Oosthuizen
 Boom Prinsloo
 Bees Roux
 Kevin Stevens
 Francois Uys
 Torsten van Jaarsveld
 Henco Venter
 Waltie Vermeulen
 Carl Wegner
 Did not play:
 Peet Coetzee
 Jacques du Toit
 Freddy Ngoza
 Adriaan Strauss
Backs

 Rayno Benjamin
 Clayton Blommetjies
 AJ Coertzen
 Pieter-Steyn de Wet
 Maphutha Dolo
 JP du Plessis
 Willie du Plessis
 Joubert Engelbrecht
 Sarel Pretorius
 Raymond Rhule
 Francois Venter
 Shaun Venter
 Elgar Watts
 Did not play:
 Renier Botha
 Cornal Hendricks
 Verner Horn
 Henry Immelman
 Cameron Jacobs
 Tertius Kruger
 Willie le Roux
 Nico Lee
 Marco Mason
Coach

 Rory Duncan

Forwards

 Willie Britz
 Robbie Coetzee
 Ruan Dreyer
 Jaco Kriel
 MB Lusaseni
 Malcolm Marx
 Derick Minnie
 Franco Mostert
 Martin Muller
 Julian Redelinghuys
 Kwagga Smith
 Warwick Tecklenburg
 Akker van der Merwe
 Schalk van der Merwe
 Jacques van Rooyen
 Chris van Zyl
 Willie Wepener
 Warren Whiteley
 Did not play:
 Fabian Booysen
 Cyle Brink
 Stephan de Wit
 Lambert Groenewald
 Ruaan Lerm
 Tyson Mulamba
 Mark Pretorius
 Dylan Smith
 Schalk van Heerden
Backs

 Marnitz Boshoff
 Andries Coetzee
 Ruan Combrinck
 Guy Cronjé
 Ross Cronjé
 Stokkies Hanekom
 Alwyn Hollenbach
 Lionel Mapoe
 Howard Mnisi
 Mark Richards
 Ricky Schroeder
 Courtnall Skosan
 Jaco van der Walt
 Harold Vorster
 Did not play:
 Michael Bondesio
 Robert de Bruyn
 Lloyd Greeff
 Deon Helberg
 Lohan Jacobs
 Ruhan Nel
 Deon van Rensburg
 Anthony Volmink
 Vainon Willis
Coach

 Johan Ackermann

Forwards

 Jonathan Adendorf
 Ryno Barnes
 Martin Bezuidenhout
 Wesley Cloete
 Carel Greeff
 Hugo Kloppers
 Ruaan Lerm
 RJ Liebenberg
 Hilton Lobberts
 Jaco Nepgen
 Steph Roberts
 Burger Schoeman
 Marnus Schoeman
 Boela Serfontein
 Ewald van der Westhuizen
 Maks van Dyk
 Janro van Niekerk
 Wendal Wehr
 Simon Westraadt
 Did not play:
 Stephan Greeff
 Luxolo Koza
 Justin Pappin
 Stephan Pretorius
Backs

 Ederies Arendse
 Francois Brummer
 Danie Dames
 Johnathan Francke
 Dean Grant
 Abrie Griesel
 Jacquin Jansen
 Rocco Jansen
 Dustin Jinka
 Doppies la Grange
 Niel Marais
 Tian Meyer
 Gouws Prinsloo
 Nico Scheepers
 Marais Schmidt
 Wayne Stevens
 Rudi van Rooyen
 PJ Vermeulen
 Did not play:
 Logan Basson
 Howard Mnisi
 Sandile Ngcobo
 Reohn van Zyl
Coach

 Hawies Fourie

Forwards

 Lourens Adriaanse
 JC Astle
 Jacques Botes
 Dale Chadwick
 Kyle Cooper
 Thomas du Toit
 Monde Hadebe
 Wiehan Hay
 Francois Kleinhans
 Stephan Lewies
 Khaya Majola
 Franco Marais
 Johan Meyer
 Danie Mienie
 Tera Mtembu
 Etienne Oosthuizen
 Matt Stevens
 Marco Wentzel
 Did not play:
 Willem Alberts
 Marcell Coetzee
 Bismarck du Plessis
 Jannie du Plessis
 Pieter-Steph du Toit
 Ryan Kankowski
 Tendai Mtawarira
Backs

 Tonderai Chavhanga
 Lionel Cronjé
 André Esterhuizen
 Conrad Hoffmann
 Paul Jordaan
 Patrick Lambie
 SP Marais
 Lwazi Mvovo
 Odwa Ndungane
 Cobus Reinach
 S'bura Sithole
 Tim Swiel
 Jaco van Tonder
 Hanco Venter
 Heimar Williams
 Cameron Wright
 Fred Zeilinga
 Did not play:
 Tyler Fisher
 Sizo Maseko
 JP Pietersen
 François Steyn
 Stefan Ungerer
Coach

 Brad McLeod-Henderson

Forwards

 Renaldo Bothma
 Jaco Bouwer
 Uzair Cassiem
 Marius Coetzer
 François du Toit
 Corné Fourie
 Frank Herne
 RW Kember
 Vincent Koch
 Giant Mtyanda
 Brian Shabangu
 Frikkie Spies
 Corné Steenkamp
 De-Jay Terblanche
 Did not play:
 JJ Breet
 Stephan Kotzé
 Doppies le Roux
 Rudi Mathee
 Jacques Momberg
 Sabelo Nhlapo
 Justin Pappin
 Pieter Stemmet
 Drew van Coller
 Eduan van der Walt
Backs

 JW Bell
 Dylon Frylinck
 Ruwellyn Isbell
 JW Jonker
 Sino Nyoka
 Trompie Pretorius
 JC Roos
 Hennie Skorbinski
 Roscko Speckman
 Heinrich Steyl
 Reynier van Rooyen
 Justin van Staden
 Coenie van Wyk
 Stefan Watermeyer
 Did not play:
 Bernado Botha
 Faf de Klerk
 Johan Herbst
 Wilmaure Louw
 Michael Nienaber
 Dewald Pretorius
 Marcello Sampson
 Deon Scholtz
 Ashwin Scott
Coach

 Jimmy Stonehouse

Forwards

 Justin Ackerman
 Gavin Annandale
 Ruan Botha
 Manuel Carizza
 Nizaam Carr
 Pat Cilliers
 Stephan Coetzee
 Rynhardt Elstadt
 Eben Etzebeth
 Gerbrandt Grobler
 Brok Harris
 Oli Kebble
 Rohan Kitshoff
 Jean Kleyn
 Siya Kolisi
 Tiaan Liebenberg
 Frans Malherbe
 Sikhumbuzo Notshe
 Scarra Ntubeni
 Pat O'Brien
 Neil Rautenbach
 Michael Rhodes
 Jurie van Vuuren
 Anton van Zyl
 Alistair Vermaak
 Did not play:
 Tazz Fuzani
 Steven Kitshoff
 Rayn Smid
 De Kock Steenkamp
 Duane Vermeulen
Backs

 Demetri Catrakilis
 Kurt Coleman
 Juan de Jongh
 Robert du Preez
 Justin Geduld
 Nic Groom
 Patrick Howard
 Cheslin Kolbe
 Dillyn Leyds
 Godlen Masimla
 Louis Schreuder
 Seabelo Senatla
 Jaco Taute
 Michael van der Spuy
 Kobus van Wyk
 EW Viljoen
 Devon Williams
 Did not play:
 Willy Ambaka
 Damian de Allende
 Jean de Villiers
 Ryno Eksteen
 Chevandré van Schoor
Coach

 Allister Coetzee

See also
 2014 Currie Cup First Division
 2014 Vodacom Cup

External links

References

 
2014
2014 in South African rugby union
2014 rugby union tournaments for clubs